The Big East Conference women's soccer tournament is the conference championship tournament in soccer for the Big East Conference.  The tournament has been held every year since 1993.  It is a single-elimination tournament and seeding is based on regular season records. The winner, declared conference champion, receives the conference's automatic bid to the NCAA Division I women's soccer championship.

Format
The teams are seeded based on the order of finish in the conference's round robin regular season.  The top six finishers qualify for the tournament.  Tiebreakers begin with the result of the head-to-head matchup.  The teams are then placed in a single-elimination bracket, with the top two seeds receiving a first round bye, until meeting in a final championship game.  After two overtime period, ties are broken by shootout rounds, with the winner of the shootout advancing.

Champions

By year

By school

Teams in italics no longer sponsor women's soccer in the Big East.

References

 
NCAA Division I women's soccer conference tournaments